Li Shuanghong (born 25 January 1970 in Daqing) is a Chinese sport shooter. She competed in rifle shooting events at the 1992 Summer Olympics. She is the twin sister of Li Duihong, a gold medalist in shooting.

Olympic results

References

1970 births
Living people
ISSF rifle shooters
Chinese female sport shooters
Shooters at the 1992 Summer Olympics
Olympic shooters of China
People from Daqing
Twin sportspeople
Chinese twins